Olive Violet Ruby Duck (also known as Olive Moores; 27 March 1912 –  19 May 1925) was a 13-year-old Australian girl who was murdered on 19 May 1925 by her father, Oliver Johnson Duck in a case of paternal filicide.

Johnson Duck shot and killed his daughter while they were travelling on horseback between Marmor and Calliope in Central Queensland after which he carried the body on horseback until he reached the Calliope River where he buried Olive's body on the riverbed, and hid the weapon.

Johnson Duck then surrendered himself to police at Calliope at approximately 10pm on 21 May 1925 where he confessed to his daughter's murder, prompting police to retrieve Olive's body from the Calliope River and transport it to Gladstone for a post-mortem examination.

Olive's body was then transported to Rockhampton, where she had lived with her maternal grandmother Margaret Moores since her mother relocated to New South Wales when she was an infant. Duck's body was buried in the South Rockhampton Cemetery on 22 May 1925.

Johnson Duck was charged with wilful murder and appeared in the Rockhampton Police Court several times between 23 May 1925 and 10 June 1925, when he was committed to stand trial. Johnson Duck's trial commenced at the Rockhampton Supreme Court on 7 July 1925, and was held over two days. The case concluded on 8 July 1925 when a jury returned a verdict of wilful murder.

Judge Frank Brennan sentenced Johnson Duck to life imprisonment with hard labour. Johnson Duck applied for leave to appeal, but his application was rejected.

Johnson Duck died in Brisbane on 30 July 1972.

Like other murders to take place in Central Queensland during the early 20th century, such as the murder of Fanny Hardwick and the murder of Emily Salsbury, the murder of Olive Duck generated interest from the national press.

References 

Female murder victims
Filicides in Australia
Incidents of violence against girls
Murder in Queensland